Soumya murder case is a criminal case regarding the rape and murder of Soumya, a 23-year-old woman from Manjakkad near Shornur, while she was travelling in a passenger train from Ernakulam to Shornur on 1 February 2011.

Incident
The incident happened in train number 56608, Ernakulam Junction-Shoranur Junction passenger train immediately after it left the Vallathol Nagar railway station. According to the prosecution, the deceased girl, aged 23, hailing from a poor family at Shornur got a small job at an institution in Ernakulam. She and her family consisting of her younger brother and their mother were eking their livelihood from the monthly salary being earned by her. Once in a while, during holidays, she used to go to her house at Shornur by the 
Ernakulam - Shornur passenger train, which leaves Ernakulam in the evening. During the course of her employment, she got acquainted with a young man employed at Ernakulam, who is the friend of some of her co-workers. They liked each other and he proposed her. Both the families also concurred to have such an alliance and thereby they decided to conduct a ceremony for fixing their betrothal at the house of the deceased on 1 February 2011. She boarded the ladies division in the last compartment of the Ernakulam-Shornur Passenger Train, which started at 5.30 p.m. on 1 February 2011, to Shornur, from the Ernakulam Town North Railway Station. When the train reached Thrissur, most of the passengers in that ladies division got down. Another lady also who was present in that ladies division got down when the train reached Wadakkanchery. There, she got down at the platform, and got back to the compartment. At that time, she could notice the hungry look stared at her by the accused, who was standing outside the compartment and by peeping through the window. When the train reached Mulloorkara, remaining passengers also got down there. As there was nobody else in the ladies division of that compartment, the deceased also got down along with them and hurriedly made an entry into the ladies coach attached just in front of that last compartment. The train reached Vallathol Nagar Railway Station, where it lay idle for some time.

The prosecution case is that the accused, Govindaswamy, who is a habitual offender, could notice that the deceased was left alone in the compartment. When the train left Vallathol Nagar Railway Station, and moved towards Shornur, the accused swiftly hoisted into that ladies compartment, and rushed to the victim. The screaming victim frantically ran here and there in a fury in the limited space available in the compartment, in order to escape from the clutches of the accused. She resisted and resisted hard. She was caught and her head was forcibly hit repeatedly on the walls of the compartment. On sustaining fatal injuries, she became dazed and practically immobilized. Her loud cries and screams died down in the compartment as wild cries. She was dropped from the running train down to the track. The side of her face forcibly hit on the crossover of the railway line.

The accused, who is experienced in that way of doing things, jumped down from the running train on the other side, rushed to her, and lifted her to a shady safe place at the side of the track. He hurriedly tore away and removed her dress, and raped the poor girl whose face was with full of blood, oozing out from the injuries on her head and face. He acted as a necrophile. After satisfying his lust, the accused ransacked her belongings, searched for the valuables in her bag, and robbed her mobile phone which was the only valuable material with that poor girl, and decamped with the booty, by leaving the victim in nudity, in supine position.

There were two male passengers of the train travelling by the general compartment attached in front of that ladies compartment wherein the deceased was travelling, heard the cries of the deceased. Even though one of them wanted to pull the alarm chain to stop the train, he was dissuaded by a middle-aged man who was standing at the door at the right rear side of that compartment by stating that the girl had jumped out and escaped, and further by warning that he should not drag others unnecessarily to court.

Within a short span of 10 minutes, the train reached Shornur. Immediately they rushed to the guard of the train and complained about the incident, which triggered in the search of the track by some young men of the locality, and the Gang-man of the Vallathol Nagar Railway Station. All of them engaged in a search at the railway track, and ultimately, by about 9.30 p.m., the distorted and mutilated body of the deceased which was in almost naked state could be traced out from the side of the railway track wherein she was subjected to rape. The deceased was seen fighting for her life and was seen moving her right hand and right leg. Blood was seen oozing out from the injuries on her face and head. There was difficulty to breathe and the breathing produced a peculiar sound on account of the obstructions on the airway as blood aspirated into it. By that time, the left side of her body had become paralytic. They took the deceased to the Shornur-Thrissur road, from where the deceased was taken to the Taluk Hospital, Wadakkanchery. She was immediately taken to the casualty of the Medical College Hospital, Thrissur.

On the basis of the First Information Statement, the Cheruthuruthy Police Station registered a crime and C.I. of Police, Chelakkara, took over the 
investigation.

Medical treatment and death
Surgical operations were done on her, and all sorts of possible medical assistance and support were given to the deceased. Even after that, her condition never improved, and she continued in the ventilator in very critical condition. By 6 February 2011, her condition became very bad and peripheral pulses were not felt. In the last consultation by the neurosurgeon at 14.30 on 6 February 2011, ECG was found to be flat line, BP was 
not recordable, and cardiac sounds were not heard. She was declared dead at 15.00 on that day.

Postmortem report

Dr. Sherly Vasu who was then working as Professor and Head of Department of Forensic Medicine, M.C.H. Thrissur conducted the postmortem examination of the deceased with the assistance of five other doctors. The opinion of her as to the cause of death mentioned in the postmortem report is as follows: "The decedent had died due to blunt injuries sustained to head as a result of blunt impact (injury no.1) and fall (injury no.2) and their complications including aspiration of blood into air passages (during unprotected unconscious state following head trauma) resulting in anoxic brain damage. She also showed injuries as a result of assault and rape. She had features of multiple organ disfunction at the time of death."

Trial and verdict
Govindaswamy alias Govindachamy(aged 30, from Virudhachalam, Cuddalore district, Tamil Nadu) has been found guilty in the rape and murder case of Soumya by the Thrissur fast track court judge, KN Raveendra Babu, on 31 October 2011. Pronouncement of judgment has been delayed for 4 November since the Public Prosecutor submitted before the court the documents to prove previous convictions of the accused which showed that he had undergone imprisonment in eight cases in Tamil Nadu and Andhra Pradesh and trial of another robbery case was in progress. He was later given death sentence by the court. High court of Kerala upheld the trial court verdict in a 359-page judgement by the judges, T.R. Ramachandran Nair and B. Kemal Pasha.

Supreme Court (bench composed of Mr. Ranjan Gogoi,  Prafulla C. Pant and Uday Umesh Lalit) set aside murder charges and altered to rigorous imprisonment for seven years under Section 325 IPC, stating that: "The death of the deceased was occasioned by a combination of injury no.1 and 2, and complications arising therefrom including aspiration of blood into the air passages, resulting in anoxic brain damage. The same, in the opinion of the doctor, had occurred due to the fact that the deceased was kept in a supine position for the purpose of sexual assault. We are of the opinion that the liability of the accused for Injury No.1 would not require a re-determination in view of the evidence. However, so far as Injury No.2 is concerned, unless the fall from the train can be ascribed to the accused on the basis of the cogent and reliable evidence, meaning thereby, that the accused had pushed the deceased out of the train and the possibility of the deceased herself jumping out of train is ruled out, the liability of the accused for the said injury may not necessary follow."

It upheld life imprisonment for rape, stating "Having regard to the fact that the said offence was committed on the deceased who had already suffered extreme injuries on her body, we are of the view that not only the offence under Section 376 IPC was committed by the accused, the same was so committed in a most brutal and grotesque manner which would justify the imposition of life sentence as awarded by the learned Trial Court and confirmed by the High Court". All the sentences imposed shall run concurrently. The judges were Ranjan Gogoi, Prafulla Chandra Pant and Uday U. Lalit.

A. Suresan appeared for prosecution in the fast track court and High Court, and K. T. S. Tulsi in Supreme Court. B. A. Aloor appeared for the accused in all courts.

Reactions
Former Supreme Court judge Justice Markandey Katju has said the Supreme Court must review its judgment in Soumya case, in which the apex court found accused Govindachamy not guilty of murder but only guilty of rape. "This is not a just punishment at all and it is hard for the public in Kerala to digest", Chief Minister of Kerala, Pinarayi Vijayan said. Law Minister of Kerala, A.K. Balan said people of the state were anxious and sad over the verdict delivered earlier in the day. Senior CPI(M) leader V. S. Achuthanandan said the verdict was 'shocking' and 'unfortunate'. Kaleeswaram Raj, a prominent lawyer in the Supreme Court and Kerala high court, felt that the verdict was shockingly soft and highly dispiriting. "With great respect, I may say that the punishment imposed by the Supreme Court is too meagre and has no deterrent effect. Also, it fails to satisfy the public consciousness. The court has rightly retained the maximum possible punishment of life imprisonment on the accused who is a potential threat to society. But the court could have done more than that. There were also other punishable offences which were not properly dealt with. Those included extortion, assault etc, which deserved separate jail terms", he wrote in the media.

In response,  The Supreme Court Bench decided to convert that blog by Justice Markandey Katju into a review petition and asked him to personally appear in court to debate. On 11 November 2016, he appeared in the court and submitted his arguments. The Court then dictated the order rejecting the review petition and issued contempt of court notice to him stating that "Prima facie, the statements made seem to be an attack on the Judges and not on the judgment". On 6 January 2017, The Supreme Court has accepted Justice Markandey Katju’s apology and closed the contempt proceedings against him.

Review
The Supreme Court decided to hear the review petition filed by the victim’s mother and the Kerala government, seeking review of its judgment. On 11 November 2016, The Supreme Court dismissed the review petition against the verdict discarding the death penalty for convict in Soumya’s murder, stating that "the role of the accused in causing injury No. 2 by pushing the victim out of train is not free from doubt and the medical opinion is to the effect that Injury No. 1, by itself, was not sufficient to cause death."

Curative petition

On 28 April 2017, a Six Judge Bench of Supreme Court has dismissed the curative petition filed by Government of Kerala stating that no case is made out within the parameters indicated in the decision of the court in Rupa Ashok Hurra vs Ashok Hurra & An. (2002).

References

Indian murder victims
Crime in Kerala
People murdered in Kerala
Criminal investigation
Violence against women in India
Rape in India
2011 murders in Asia
2011 murders in India
Incidents of violence against women
History of Kerala (1947–present)